The 1963 Grand Prix motorcycle racing season was the 15th F.I.M. Road Racing World Championship Grand Prix season. The season consisted of twelve Grand Prix races in six classes: 500cc, 350cc, 250cc, 125cc, 50cc and Sidecars 500cc. It began on 5 May, with Spanish Grand Prix and ended with Japanese Grand Prix on 10 November.

1963 Grand Prix season calendar

† Non-championship race.

Standings

Scoring system
Points were awarded to the top six finishers in each race.  Only the best of five races were counted in 50cc, 350cc and 500cc championships, best of seven in 125cc and best of six in 250cc championships, while in the Sidecars, only the best of four races were counted.

500cc final standings

350cc Standings

250cc Standings

125cc Standings

50cc Standings

References
 Büla, Maurice & Schertenleib, Jean-Claude (2001). Continental Circus 1949-2000. Chronosports S.A. 

Grand Prix motorcycle racing seasons
Grand Prix motorcycle racing season